Sahan Nanayakkare (born 19 August 1995) is a Sri Lankan cricketer. He made his first-class debut for Ragama Cricket Club in the 2014–15 Premier Trophy on 13 March 2015.

References

External links
 

1995 births
Living people
Sri Lankan cricketers
Ragama Cricket Club cricketers
Cricketers from Colombo